The 1936–37 Scottish Cup was the 59th staging of Scotland's most prestigious football knockout competition. The Cup was won by Celtic who defeated Aberdeen in the final before a European record domestic crowd of 147,365.

Fourth round

Semi-finals

Final

Teams

References

Scottish Cup seasons
Scot
Cup